Craig Joseph Charles (born 11 July 1964) is an English actor, comedian, television and radio presenter. He is best known for his roles as Dave Lister in the science fiction sitcom Red Dwarf and Lloyd Mullaney in the soap opera Coronation Street. He presented the gladiator-style game show Robot Wars from 1998 to 2004, and narrated the comedy endurance show Takeshi's Castle. As a DJ, he appears on BBC Radio 6 Music.

Charles first appeared on television as a performance poet, which led to minor presenting roles. After finding fame in Red Dwarf, he regularly featured on national television with celebrity appearances on many popular shows while he continued to host a wide variety of programmes. From 2017 to 2022, Charles hosted The Gadget Show for Channel 5. His acting credits include playing inmate Eugene Buffy in the ITV drama The Governor, and leading roles in the British films Fated and Clubbing to Death. He has toured the UK extensively as a stand-up comedian.

Charles has hosted The Craig Charles Funk and Soul Show on BBC radio since 2002, and performs DJ sets at numerous clubs and festivals, nationally and internationally. In September 2015, he left Coronation Street after ten years of acting, to film new episodes of Red Dwarf and to continue his BBC Radio 6 Music and BBC Radio 2 broadcasting.

Early life 
Craig Joseph Charles was born in Liverpool on 11 July 1964, the son of a Guyanese father and Irish mother. He grew up on the Cantril Farm housing estate with his older brother, Dean (died 2014), and two other brothers, Jimmy and Emile. He attended West Derby Comprehensive School followed by Childwall Hall College of Further Education, studying A-levels in History, Government & Politics, English Literature, and General Studies. He won a national competition run by The Guardian newspaper for a poem he wrote when he was 12 years old. Upon leaving school, Charles spent time working in a studio at Central Hall on Renshaw Street in Liverpool.

Early career 
Charles began his career as a contemporary and urban performance poet on the British cabaret circuit. His performances were considered original, with Charles described as having a natural ironic wit which appealed to talent scouts. In 1981, Charles climbed on stage at a Teardrop Explodes concert and recited a humorous, but derogatory, poem about the band's singer, Julian Cope. He was invited to open subsequent gigs for the group and went on to perform as a support act in pubs and clubs for the following three years, and at events such as the Larks in the Park music festival at Sefton Park (1982). He performed poetry reading poems by Vladimir Mayakovsky, W. H. Auden, and E. E. Cummings, at Liverpool's Everyman Theatre (1983), with such poets as Roger McGough and Adrian Henri.

Charles was involved in the Liverpool music scene, writing and singing lyrics for a number of local rock bands. In 1980, he played keyboards, bass and provided voice in the rock band Watt 4. He performed his political rap lyrics as a 'Wordsmith'. In 1983, Charles was invited to record a session on the John Peel BBC Radio show, performing his poems backed by a band. This was his first professional engagement. He recorded a further Peel Session in 1984.

Charles realised he was using poetry as a vehicle for his sense of humour and progressed into stand-up comedy. He was part of the Red Wedge comedy tour in 1986, which aimed to raise awareness of the social problems of the time, in support of the Labour Party. He also performed his first one-man show in 1986, which premiered in Edinburgh, and then toured internationally. Charles was a guest on programmes including Janice Long's Radio 1 show, and he was a regular panellist on Ned Sherrin's chat show Loose Ends (1987–88) on BBC Radio 4.

Television career

Performance poetry 
Charles first appeared on television as the resident poet on the arts programme Riverside on BBC2 and on the day-time BBC1 chat show Pebble Mill at One. Charles was the resident poet on the Channel 4 programme Black on Black (1985) and its entertainment-based successor Club Mix (1986), and he appeared, weekly, as a John Cooper Clarke-style 'punk poet' on the BBC2 pop music programme Oxford Road Show (ORS). Charles performed his political poems as stand-up comedy on the late-night show Saturday Live (1985–87) and on the prime-time BBC1 chat show Wogan (1986–87), where he performed a topical poem in a weekly feature. He also appeared as a guest on shows including Open Air (1988). Charles included significant acting in his performance style, enabling him to put the emotion across.
In September 2015, Charles performed his "epic" poem Scary Fairy and the Tales of the Dark Wood live with the BBC Philharmonic orchestra, in a concert to be broadcast on BBC Radio 2's Friday Night is Music Night at Halloween.

Red Dwarf 

Charles' first television acting role was the Liverpudlian slob Dave Lister in science fiction comedy series Red Dwarf. He was introduced to the show by Saturday Live and Red Dwarf producer Paul Jackson, who wanted his opinion on whether the black character Cat was a racist stereotype. Charles, who like all of the eventual main cast had no acting experience, was eventually offered an audition after begging Jackson.

Charles has appeared in all twelve series as well as Red Dwarf: The Promised Land. Charles' younger brother, Emile Charles, guest-starred in the Series III episode "Timeslides", and the songs "Bad News" and "Cash" in this episode were written by Charles and performed by his band. The role has involved Charles playing a variety of alternative characters, including a gangster, a cowboy and angelic and evil versions of Lister, and in him carrying out a wide range of stunts, and acting involving special effects. All series, except VII and IX, were recorded in front of a studio audience. Along with Danny John-Jules (Cat), Charles is one of only two cast members to appear in every episode of Red Dwarf to date.

Charles reads the audiobook editions of both the Red Dwarf novel Last Human and his book The Log: A Dwarfer's Guide to Everything, and he regularly attends sci-fi, comedy and memorabilia conventions in connection with the Red Dwarf franchise. During Back to Earth, Lister visits the set of Coronation Street, where he meets the actor Craig Charles.

Robot Wars 
Charles presented Robot Wars on BBC2 (1998–2003) and Channel 5 (2003–04), from series 2 until series 7, which included two Extreme series and numerous 'specials'. Charles was the main host and presided over the arena in which teams of amateur engineers battled their home-made radio-controlled robots against each other, and against the house robots. Charles introduced the show, enthusiastically announced the results of the battles and spoke to the contestants after the main events. He ended each episode with a short Robot Wars-themed poem. Charles' son, Jack, appeared on the show on several occasions, and was a contestant on "Team Nemesis" during series 4. Charles also hosted the Robot Wars Live UK tour, in 2001 and shows performed at the Wembley Arena.

Robot Wars returned to the BBC in 2016. Charles stated his interest in hosting it again, but the job went to Dara Ó Briain and Angela Scanlon.

Takeshi's Castle 
Charles provided the English voice-over commentary for the Challenge (2002–04) rebroadcast of the popular game show Takeshi's Castle, originally by Tokyo Broadcasting System in Japan. In each episode, between 100 and 142 contestants attempted to pass a series of wacky and near-impossible physical challenges to reach the Show Down at the castle against Japanese actor Takeshi Kitano for a chance to win large cash prizes. Charles co-wrote the programme and commentated throughout all 122 episodes of the four series, and also some special and "best of" episodes. He provided comedy insights into the contestants' abilities, which were designed to appeal to adult audiences, as well as younger viewers - and also coined the term "Keshi Heads" to describe fans of the show. A 2013 reboot narrated by Dick and Dom was not as well received.

Coronation Street 
In 2005, Charles joined the main cast of Coronation Street, playing a philandering taxicab driver, Lloyd Mullaney. Charles introduced aspects of the character himself, making Lloyd a Northern Soul DJ and record collector, and funk music enthusiast. Charles has chosen funk and soul songs playing as backing tracks during scenes, and posters for The Craig Charles Funk & Soul Club and Red Dwarf have appeared in the background.

Charles portrayed Lloyd as tough, but kind hearted and romantic, and the character was popular with viewers. Charles added a comedy element to the role, but was also involved in traumatic and emotional scenes with intricate storylines. In 2010, his character was involved in the show's dramatic 50th anniversary tram crash storyline, which was broadcast live. Charles presented documentaries for the show, including 50 Years of Corrie Stunts (2010), which is included on the Tram Crash DVD. In November 2011, Charles took time off from Coronation Street to film a new series of Red Dwarf, returning in April 2012. In February 2014 an online mini-series, Steve & Lloyd's Streetcar Stories, ran alongside the television show's storyline.

In May 2015, Craig announced he would be leaving Coronation Street for Red Dwarf, BBC Radio 2, and BBC Radio 6 Music. Lloyd left in a red Cadillac during the live episode on 23 September, although his final pre-recorded farewell scenes with Steve were shown during the following episode.

Other acting roles 
Charles has acted in episodes of popular dramas such as The Bill (1995), EastEnders (2002) and Holby City (2003) and in the comedy The 10 Percenters (1996). Charles played the emotionally disturbed and violent prisoner, Eugene Buffy, in the highly successful Lynda La Plante drama series The Governor (1996); the title role in the Channel 4 pirate sitcom Captain Butler (1997); the warden of a women's prison in the Canadian sci-fi fantasy Lexx (2001); Detective Chief Inspector Mercer in seven episodes of the BBC soap opera Doctors (2003); and soccer agent, Joel Brooks, in the Sky TV football soap Dream Team (2004).

Other presenting roles 
Charles has presented children's television programmes, including What's That Noise? (1989) and Parallel 9 (1992) on BBC1 and Go Getters (1994) on ITV. He was the travelling reporter for the highly acclaimed, but controversial, BBC 'mockumentary' Ghostwatch, which tricked viewers into believing it was a live investigation into ghost sightings in a suburban home on Halloween night (1992). Charles presented the virtual reality game show Cyberzone (1993) on BBC2; the late-night entertainment show Funky Bunker (1997) on ITV; the reality show Jailbreak (2000) on Channel 5; the discussion show Amazing Space: The Pub Guide to the Universe (2001) on National Geographic; and the late-night current affairs chat show Weapons of Mass Distraction (2004) on ITV.

Other appearances 
Charles has appeared on celebrity editions of University Challenge (1998), Can't Cook, Won't Cook (1998), The Weakest Link (2004), The Chase (2012) and Pointless (2013), and comedy panel shows such as Have I Got News for You (1995), Just a Minute (1995) and They Think It's All Over (1996) and Keith Lemon's Through the Keyhole (2014). He was a team captain on the sci-fi quiz series Space Cadets (1997) on Channel 4, which guest starred William Shatner. Charles has opened the National Lottery draw (1997) and his home has featured on Through the Keyhole. Charles was a contestant in the Celebrity Poker Club tournament (2004) on Challenge, where he reached the semi-finals, and in the Channel 4 reality game show, The Games (2005), which documented the contestants' intensive training regime and each live Olympic Games-style sporting event.

From 16 November 2014, Charles took part in the fourteenth series of I'm a Celebrity...Get Me Out of Here!. However, on 20 November, Charles left the series soon after learning that his brother Dean had died after suffering a heart attack.

Radio 
As well as his early appearances on shows such as Radio 4's Loose Ends (1987–88), and Kaleidoscope, in the early 1990s, Charles could be heard on the London Radio Station Kiss 100 (Kiss FM) as the Breakfast show presenter. In 1995, Charles played the Porter in Steven Berkoff's adaptation of Shakespeare's Macbeth, on Radio 4.

Since 2002, Charles has been a DJ on BBC Radio 6 Music presenting The Craig Charles Funk and Soul Show, on air on Saturday evenings 6 pm to 9 pm, where he plays a diverse range of funk and soul music, from classic tracks to the latest releases, and provides publicity for less familiar bands. Charles explains the context for the music and carries out interviews with guest musicians. He was with the station at its launch, and while it was being tested during the previous year, under the name Network Y. Charles has also hosted the station's Breakfast Show (2004), and sits in for other presenters including Andrew Collins, Phil Wilding and Phill Jupitus and Radcliffe & Maconie.

From January until November 2014, Charles also broadcast the Funk and Soul Show live on BBC Radio 2, immediately after his 6 Music show. He regularly sits in for various presenters, and has presented numerous programmes on the station, including The Craig Charles Soul All-Nighter (2011), which he hosted continuously for 12 hours, and the Beatleland (2012) documentary on The Beatles. Charles has also chosen music as a guest of other broadcasters such as Ken Bruce on Radio 2 and Liz Kershaw on 6 Music.  Charles covered for Graham Norton on Radio 2's Saturday mid-morning show during Norton's 10-week 2015 summer break. From 16 April 2016 until 18 June 2022, Charles presented the House Party on Saturday nights on BBC Radio 2, with the show airing between 10 pm and midnight. For eight weeks from April–June 2020, he also presented Craig Charles At Teatime between 4 pm and 7 pm on weekdays on Radio 6 Music. The show was sometimes billed as Craig Charles Weekend Workout on Fridays.

Since 18 October 2021, Charles has hosted the weekday afternoon show on BBC Radio 6 Music (1 pm – 4 pm).

Music 
Charles has been involved in the music industry through much of his career. His bands have included Watt 4 (1980), in which he played keyboards and sang, Craig Charles and the Beat Burglars (1989), The Sons of Gordon Gekko (1989), where he wrote lyrics and also composed tunes and The Eye (2000–02), with whom he recorded the rock album "Giving You The Eye, Live at the Edinburgh Festival". Charles plays guitar and piano.

In 1987, Charles provided the poem track used for the opening credits of the BBC series The Marksman (in which he also acted), which is included on the album "The Marksman: Music from the BBC TV series". Charles wrote lyrics for Suzanne Rhatigan's album To Hell With Love (1992). In 1993, Charles was signed to the Acid Jazz record label.

In 2009, Charles formed the Fantasy Funk Band from the leading British musicians in the genre, and has presented the band at festivals, including Glastonbury and the BBC's Proms in the Park. As a continuation of his 6 Music show, Charles regularly takes the Craig Charles Funk & Soul Club to varied venues across the UK and abroad, and to the major UK music festivals. He performs live DJ sets, occasionally comperes and curates events, including his own Craig Charles Fantasy Weekender, and has broadcast the radio show live from festival locations.

In 2012, Charles released the compilation album The Craig Charles Funk & Soul Club, on CD and as a digital download, as part of a three-album deal with Freestyle Records. The second volume was released in the same format in 2013, and the third in 2014. He followed these with a Craig Charles Funk and Soul Classics album of three CDs in 2015.

Stand-up comedy and theatre 
Charles returned to stand-up comedy between 1995  and 2001, regularly touring his one-man adult-rated shows nationally and releasing the videos Craig Charles: Live on Earth! (1995), Live Official Bootleg (1996) and Sickbag (2000). International performances included the Great Norwegian Comedy Festival and the Melbourne International Comedy Festival.

Charles appeared in the John Godber comedy play Teechers, in which he swapped in and out of various roles, at the Arts Theatre, London, and at the Edinburgh Festival (1989), and he played Idle Jack in the pantomime Dick Whittington, at the Hull New Theatre (1997). In 2000, he performed the show Craig Charles and His Band at the Edinburgh Festival.

Charles has a regular slot at Butlins Minehead House Of Fun Weekend every third November for three nights, of DJing, Comedy, Twanging and singing.

Film roles 
Charles played Eddie in the 1987 political drama Business as Usual. In 2006, Charles starred in two British feature films: the fantasy film Fated and the gangster film Clubbing to Death. Charles voiced Zipper the Cat in the animation Prince Cinders (1993) and Asterix in Asterix Conquers America (1994). Roles in short films include playing Keith Dennis in the comedy The Colour of Funny (1999) and Mark in the drama Ten Minutes (2004).

Writing 
In 1993, Charles worked with Russell Bell on the Craig Charles Almanac of Total Knowledge, writing about his 'streetwise' sense of humour on a range of topics, from the world's most embarrassing stories to how to explain the mysteries of the universe. In 1997, Charles and Bell wrote Charles' Red Dwarf character's book The Log, in which Lister decides to leave a log detailing mankind's greatest achievements. In 1998, Charles published No Other Blue, a collection of his poetry, with illustrations by Philippa Drakeford, on diverse personal subjects including prison, his mother's final illness, love and politics at home and abroad. More recently he has written a series of nursery rhymes titled "Scary Fairy and the Tales of the Dark Wood".

In 2000, Charles wrote his first autobiography about his experiences growing up in Liverpool, titled No Irish, No Niggers. In 2007, he announced he would release his autobiography, planned for March 2008, published by Hodder Headline and titled On the Rocks, which would cover the recent incidents in his life and be based on much of his journal, which Charles said he kept while in rehab.

Charles has been involved in journalism and has had a column in Time Out magazine. In 1994, he launched a single issue of Comedy magazine with articles dedicated to the comedy circuit. In 2005 and 2006, Charles was a monthly columnist for the Liverpool Echo newspaper. His television writing credits include The Easter Stories (1994), Funky Bunker (1997) and Takeshi's Castle (2002). He is also involved in music journalism as he wrote liner notes for the funk and soul music producer Mr. Confuse for his albums Feel The Fire (2008), Do You Realize (2012) and Only A Man (2018) regarding his work as a music presenter for The Craig Charles Funk and Soul Show on BBC Radio 6 Music.

Personal life 
Charles resides in Barton upon Humber, North Lincolnshire. He has three children: a son named Jack from his first marriage to actress Cathy Tyson, and two daughters named Anna-Jo and Nellie from his second marriage to Jackie Fleming.

In July 1994, Charles and another man were charged with rape and four counts of indecent assault, following false allegations by an associate and ex-girlfriend of Charles. Charles was remanded in custody for three and a half months before being granted bail, during which time he was assaulted by a man wielding a makeshift knife. In March 1995, Charles and his co-accused were acquitted of all charges at trial. After being cleared, Charles spoke of the need to restore anonymity for those accused of rape. He stated, "The fact that my name and address along with my picture can appear on the front of the papers before the so-called 'victim' has even signed a statement proves that anonymity for rape defendants is a must and that the law must be changed."

Charles has battled drug addiction—he described himself in 2015 as quite an addictive person, trying to find healthier  addictions, of which work was one. In June 2006, newspaper allegations of crack cocaine use resulted in Charles being suspended from both Coronation Street and BBC Radio 6 Music. In August, Charles was arrested and released on bail pending further enquiries, and in September he accepted a caution for possession of a Class A drug. Charles returned to hosting his 6 Music show from November 2006 and filming Coronation Street from January 2007. In a 2015 interview, Charles spoke of his need to remain "vigilant" in abstaining from drugs. In 2020 he said that the newspaper reports were the best thing that could have happened to him, leading him to join Narcotics Anonymous and straighten out his personal life.

Credits

Filmography

Radio

Bibliography

Published
 1993, Craig Charles Almanac of Total Knowledge, (with Russell Bell), Penguin Books
 1997, The Log: A Dwarfer's Guide to Everything, (with Russell Bell), Penguin Books
 1998, No Other Blue, (illustrations by Philippa Drakeford), Penguin Books

Unpublished
 2000, No Irish, No Niggers, Penguin Books 
 2008, On the Rocks, Hodder Headline

References

External links 

 
 Craig Charles (BBC Radio 6 Music)
 The Craig Charles Funk and Soul Show (BBC Radio 6 Music)
 
 Craig Charles BFI site

1964 births
English people of Guyanese descent
English people of Irish descent
English radio DJs
English male poets
English male radio actors
English male soap opera actors
English television presenters
Male actors from Liverpool
Comedians from Liverpool
BBC Radio 2 presenters
BBC Radio 6 Music presenters
Black British male actors
Black British male comedians
Robot Wars (TV series) presenters
People acquitted of rape
People from Knowsley, Merseyside
People from Liverpool
False allegations of sex crimes
Living people
20th-century English comedians
21st-century English comedians
British male comedy actors
English spoken word artists
20th-century English poets
20th-century English male writers

I'm a Celebrity...Get Me Out of Here! (British TV series) participants